The Norwegian Police Security Service is the police security agency of Norway. The agency was previously known as POT ( or Police Surveillance Agency), the name change was decided by the Parliament of Norway on 2 June 2001.

History and organization

The service was established in 1937 by direction of the Ministry of Justice led by Trygve Lie. It is responsible for monitoring and maintaining interior security in Norway. Known operational departments include counterintelligence unit, counterterrorism unit, counterproliferation and organized crime unit, counterextremism unit, investigation unit, surveillance unit, technology unit, security analysis unit and foreign citizens unit. In addition, PST is in charge of all VIP protection domestically and abroad except for the royal family, which has its own independent escort service.

PST is, unlike all ordinary police services, not a part of the National Police Directorate, but placed directly under the Ministry of Justice and Public Security. The agency is monitored by the Norwegian Parliamentary Intelligence Oversight Committee, after the debates concerning the Lund Report.

Directors
This is a list of the directors of the agency.

 1957–1966 : Asbjørn Bryhn
 1967–1982 : Gunnar Haarstad
 1982–1990 : Jostein Erstad
 1990–1991 : Svein Urdal
 1991–1993 : Jan Grøndahl (acting)
 1993–1996 : Hans Olav Østgaard
 1996–1997 : Ellen Holager Andenæs (acting)
 1997–2003 : Per Sefland
 2003–2004 : Arnstein Øverkil (acting)
 2004–2009 : Jørn Holme
 2009 : Roger Berg (acting)
 2009–2012 : Janne Kristiansen
 2012 : Roger Berg (acting)
 2012–2019 : Marie Benedicte Bjørnland
 2019–2022: Hans Sverre Sjøvold
 2022- : Beate Gangås

References

External links
Official website (in Norwegian)
Instruction for the Norwegian Police Security Service (in Norwegian)
Law on oversight of Intelligence, Surveillance and Security Agencies 

 
1937 establishments in Norway